Pervasive refusal syndrome (PRS), also known as pervasive arousal withdrawal syndrome (PAWS) is a rare hypothesized pediatric mental disorder. PRS is not included in the standard psychiatric classification systems; that is, PRS is not a recognized mental disorder in the World Health Organization's current (ICD-10) and upcoming (ICD-11) International Classification of Diseases and the current Diagnostic and Statistical Manual of Mental Disorders (DSM-5).

Purported signs and symptoms
According to some authors, PRS symptoms have common characteristics with other psychiatric disorders, but (according to these authors) current psychiatric classification schemes, such as the Diagnostic and Statistical Manual of Mental Disorders, cannot account for the full scope of symptoms seen in PRS. Purported symptoms include partial or complete refusal to eat, move, talk, or care for oneself; active and angry resistance to acts of help and support; social withdrawal; and school refusal.

Hypothesized causes
Trauma might be a causal factor because PRS is repeatedly seen in refugees and witnesses to violence. Viral infections might be a risk factor for PRS.

Mechanism
Some authors hypothesize that learned helplessness is one of the mechanisms involved in PRS. A number of cases have been reported in the context of eating disorders.

Hypothesized epidemiology
Epidemiological studies are lacking. Pervasive refusal syndrome is reportedly more frequent in girls than boys. The average age of onset is purported to be 7–15.

See also
Resignation syndrome
Asylum seekers with apathetic refugee children

References

Psychopathological syndromes